Pennsylvania Route 27 (PA 27) is a  state highway located in northwest Pennsylvania. The western terminus of the route is at Park Avenue near U.S. Route 6 (US 6) and US 19 in Meadville. The eastern terminus is at PA 69 three miles (5 km) south of Sugar Grove.

History

From 1927 to 1928, PA 27 between U.S. Route 322 in Meadville and US 6 in the Pittsfield Township community of Pittsfield was known as the western segment of Pennsylvania Route 47. In 1928, west PA 47 was decommissioned and replaced with PA 27.

In April 2003, the western terminus of the route was moved from US 6 and US 19 to Park Avenue, which had been the western terminus of PA 27 from 1928 to 1974.  However, west of Park Avenue, PA 27 is still signed along North St. Market St., Terrace St and Reynolds Ave. to connect with US 6 and US 19.

Major intersections

PA 27 Truck

Pennsylvania Route 27 Truck is a  truck route in Crawford County, Pennsylvania. In 1980, the designation was established to remove trucks from the complicated intersection with Pennsylvania Route 8 and to provide direct access for local trucks past the Titusville's small industrial area along St. John Street. For its entire length it is cosigned with Truck Route 8.

See also

References

External links

Pennsylvania Highways: PA 27

027
Transportation in Crawford County, Pennsylvania
Transportation in Venango County, Pennsylvania
Transportation in Warren County, Pennsylvania